Silver Plume is a Statutory Town located in Clear Creek County, Colorado, United States. Silver Plume is a former silver mining camp along Clear Creek in the Front Range of the Rocky Mountains. The federally designated Georgetown-Silver Plume Historic District comprises Silver Plume, the neighboring town of Georgetown, and the Georgetown Loop Historic Mining & Railroad Park between the two towns.

The town population was 170 at the 2010 census. The Silver Plume Post Office has the ZIP code 80476.<ref name=ZIPcode></</ref>

Geography
Silver Plume is located in the valley of Clear Creek at  (39.695919, -105.726066). Interstate 70 and U.S. Route 6 pass through the town, with access from Exit 226.

According to the United States Census Bureau, the town of Silver Plume has a total area of 0.2 square miles (0.6 km), all of it land.

Climate

According to the Köppen Climate Classification system, Silver Plume has a subarctic climate, abbreviated "Dfc" on climate maps.

History

The town of Silver Plume has a very rich history. That history can be viewed by the general public either at the George Rowe Museum, which is in the original school house of the town, or by walking the 7:30 Mine Trail, which gives the individual a grand view of the Silver Plume valley and the town nestled at its base.

Many tales circulate about the town. One involves its naming. According to records and legends, Louis Dupuy, the owner of the Hotel De Paris, was also a newspaper editor for the town. When miners from Silver Plume brought him samples of the town's ore and asked him what they should name the small camp, he allegedly wrote a short poem on the spot:

Knights today are miners bold,
Who delve in deep mines' gloom,
To honor men who dig for gold,
For ladies whom their arms enfold,
We'll name the town Silver Plume!

Many other legends abound about the small "Living Ghost Town". One involves a much-beloved citizen from the mining days, Clifford Griffin. According to legend, Mr. Griffin came from the state of New York, where he was raised. Griffin became engaged in New York, but his fiancée tragically, and mysteriously, died the night before their wedding. Her death was contributed to unnameable "natural causes", and to escape the painful memories of his beloved, he moved to Colorado with his brother, who eventually became the owner of the 7:30 Mine (so named because their day shift started a generous hour later than the other mines, who started at 6:30 AM). Clifford became the manager of the 7:30, and was much loved by his miners for his kindness. According to local legend, every Christmas he bought all his miners a goose for their families, and every Fourth of July, he paid off every bar between Silver Plume and current-day Bakerville  to the west, so his miners could enjoy their holiday without spending their family's money. Not only did he take care of his miners, every evening he provided them with entertainment as well. Every evening he would sit near the edge of a nearby cliff and play his violin. Due to the incredible acoustics of the valley, the entire town could step outside and listen to his concerts. According to local legend, one evening, after a particularly beautiful recital, the residents heard a gunshot. Assuming the worst, the miners of the 7:30 raced up the trail to the entrance, and there they found Clifford Griffin, shot through the heart, in a grave he'd dug himself. A note in the nearby Manager's Office told the tale. It asked the residents of Silver Plume to leave him where he lay, because that's where he'd experienced the most happiness since his wife died. Not only did they follow his request, the town erected a 10-foot-tall Gunnison Granite monument in his honor, directly on top of his grave site. The monument can still be seen today, on the cliffs directly in front of the 7:30 Mine.

Demographics

As of the census of 2000, there were 203 people, 93 households, and 47 families residing in the town. The racial makeup of the town was 94.09% White, 3.45% from other races, and 2.46% from two or more races. Hispanic or Latino of any race were 9.36% of the population.

There were 93 households, out of which 24.7% had children under the age of 18 living with them, 47.3% were married couples living together, 2.2% had a female householder with no husband present, and 48.4% were non-families. 39.8% of all households were made up of individuals, and 4.3% had someone living alone who was 65 years of age or older.  The average household size was 2.18 and the average family size was 3.02.

In the town, the population was spread out, with 22.2% under the age of 18, 11.8% from 18 to 24, 33.5% from 25 to 44, 30.0% from 45 to 64, and 2.5% who were 65 years of age or older.  The median age was 38 years. For every 100 females, there were 128.1 males.  For every 100 females age 18 and over, there were 129.0 males.

The median income for a household in the town was $35,208, and the median income for a family was $41,667. Males had a median income of $33,750 versus $23,438 for females. The per capita income for the town was $18,880.  About 18.3% of families and 25.3% of the population were below the poverty line, including 50.0% of those under the age of eighteen and none of those 65 or over.

See also

Outline of Colorado
Index of Colorado-related articles
State of Colorado
Colorado cities and towns
Colorado municipalities
Colorado counties
Clear Creek County, Colorado
List of statistical areas in Colorado
Front Range Urban Corridor
North Central Colorado Urban Area
Denver-Aurora-Boulder, CO Combined Statistical Area
Denver-Aurora-Broomfield, CO Metropolitan Statistical Area
Arapaho National Forest
Colorado Silver Boom

References

External links
Town of Silver Plume official website
CDOT map of the Town of Silver Plume

Towns in Clear Creek County, Colorado
Towns in Colorado
National Historic Landmarks in Colorado
Denver metropolitan area